Ingram Island is part of the Great Barrier Reef Marine Park in the Howick Group National Park and is about 100 km south-east of Cape Melville, Queensland.

The island is north-west of Howick Island in Helensvale. Its nearby cities are Townsville, Port Moresby, Merauke Sea turtles frequent this area and there is also a cruise ship anchorage.

References

Islands on the Great Barrier Reef
Islands of Far North Queensland
Uninhabited islands of Australia
Great Barrier Reef Marine Park